The 76th Regiment Illinois Volunteer Infantry was an infantry regiment that served in the Union Army during the American Civil War.

Service
76th Regiment Illinois  was organized at Kankakee, Illinois and mustered into Federal service on August 22, 1862.

The regiment was discharged from service on August 4, 1865.

Total strength and casualties
The regiment suffered 1 officer and 51 enlisted men who were killed in action or mortally wounded and 2 officers and 205 enlisted men who died of disease, for a total of 259 fatalities.

Commanders
Colonel Alonzo W. Mack - Resigned January 7, 1863.
Colonel Samual T. Busey - Mustered out with the regiment.

See also
List of Illinois Civil War Units
Illinois in the American Civil War

Notes

References
The Civil War Archive

Units and formations of the Union Army from Illinois
1862 establishments in Illinois
Military units and formations established in 1862
Military units and formations disestablished in 1865